Halili may refer to the following people:
Given name
 Halili Nagime (born 1993), Brazilian-American association football player

Surname
 Abu Zubayr Al Halili, suspected member of al-Qaeda in Morocco
 Antonio Halili (1946–2018), Filipino politician
 Argjent Halili (born 1982), Albanian football goalkeeper
 Dave Halili, American fine arts illustrator and graphic designer
 Grent Halili (born 1998), Albanian football forward
 Katrina Halili (born 1986), Filipina actress and model
 Mahir Halili (born 1975), Albanian football player
 Mico Halili, Filipino sports journalist
 Ndriqim Halili (born 1993), German–Albanian football player
 Nevzat Halili (born 1946), Macedonian politician
 Refik Halili, chairman and main sponsor of KF Tirana, Albania
 Sheena Halili (born 1987), Filipina actress
 Skënder Halili (1940–1982), Albanian football player
 Skënder Halili Complex in Albania

Albanian-language surnames
Tagalog-language surnames